James Glenwright Unger (born January 18, 1985) in Garfield Heights, Ohio is a retired American hockey player. He most recently played with the Johnstown Chiefs of the ECHL during the 2007-08 ECHL season.

Playing career
Unger was first noticed as a standout forward for the Topeka ScareCrows during the 2001-2003 seasons in the USHL.  During his time in Topeka, Unger compiled 52 points in 100 games played, scoring 23 goals, 29 assists, and 181 penalty minutes.

Unger played university hockey at Bowling Green State University from 2003 to 2007.  During his 129 GP for BGSU, Unger amassed 78 total points, 40 career goals, 38 assists, and 189 penalty minutes.  The defining moment of Unger's college career came when he set a CCHA record in 2007.  The record is for most goals scored in a period with 4 goals in a 7-5 loss vs. University of Nebraska at Omaha.

Unger's short-lived pro career came in the ECHL with the Toledo Storm during the 2006-2007 season in which he had 1 GP with no points.  During the 2006-07 ECHL playoffs, he had 4 GP with 1 goal and 2 assists.  The following season Unger had a brief stint with the Johnstown Chiefs in which he played in two games but did not score.

Personal
Unger retired from professional hockey in February 2008 and has since started a career in the financial services industry.

References

External links

1985 births
American men's ice hockey forwards
Bowling Green Falcons men's ice hockey players
Johnstown Chiefs players
Living people
Toledo Storm players
Ice hockey players from Ohio
People from Garfield Heights, Ohio
Sportspeople from Cuyahoga County, Ohio